Kantipuria is a genus of moths in the family Sesiidae.

Species
Kantipuria lyu Gorbunov & Arita, 1999

References

Sesiidae